Mordecai Place Historic District  is a historic neighborhood and national historic district located at Raleigh, North Carolina. The district encompasses 182 contributing buildings and 1 contributing object in the most architecturally varied of Raleigh's early-20th century suburbs for the white middle-class. Mordecai Place was listed on the National Register of Historic Places in February 1998, with a boundary increase in 2000.

History
The land was originally home to a plantation house built by Joel Lane in 1785. About 1824 the house underwent significant alterations that resulted in the Greek Revival dwelling that is today a house museum. Beginning in 1916, land south of the house was sold and subdivided for residential development. When the Mordecai family sold the land, it made multiple stipulations. The neighborhood was named in honor of the plantation, and only whites could live on most of the land (about eighteen acres near the railroad could either be sold for residences for African Americans or used for factories).

Building styles
Mordecai Place was developed between about 1900 to the 1950s and includes notable examples of Colonial Revival, Classical Revival, Dutch Colonial Revival, Spanish Mission Revival, Tudor Revival, Italian Renaissance Revival and Bungalow / American Craftsman style architecture.  Within the district is the Mordecai Historic Park, which includes the separately listed Mordecai House.  Other notable buildings are the former Pilot School and the Pilot Baptist Church (c. 1917). There are also a few examples of a more typically rural vernacular style, the two-story, side-gabled I-house. Towards the middle of the twentieth century, smaller Cape Cods and Minimal Traditional houses were built.

See also
 List of Registered Historic Places in North Carolina
 Mordecai House

References

Bibliography
National Register of Historic Places Nomination Form Retrieved 2012-06-20

External links 
 National Register Historic Districts in Raleigh, North Carolina, RHDC
 Mordecai Place Historic District, RHDC
 Mordecai Place Historic District, RHDC
 Mordecai Historic Park Website

Houses on the National Register of Historic Places in North Carolina
Historic districts on the National Register of Historic Places in North Carolina
Colonial Revival architecture in North Carolina
Jews and Judaism in North Carolina
Mordecai family
Neoclassical architecture in North Carolina
Neighborhoods in Raleigh, North Carolina
National Register of Historic Places in Raleigh, North Carolina
Houses in Raleigh, North Carolina